Endeostigmata is a suborder of acariform mites. There are about ten families in Endeostigmata. The grouping is strongly suspected to be paraphyletic, containing unrelated early diverging lineages of mites.

Taxonomy

 Suborder Endeostigmata Reuter, 1909 (5 superfamilies, 10 families, 27 genera, 108 species)
 Infraorder Bimichaliida Oconnor, 1984 (1 superfamily)
Superfamily Alycoidea G. Canestrini & Fanzago, 1877 (3 families)
Family Alycidae G. Canestrini & Fanzago, 1877 (6 genera, 29 species)
Family Nanorchestidae Grandjean, 1937 (5 genera, 45 species)
Family Proterorhagiidae Lindquist & Palacios-Vargas, 1991 (1 genus, 1 species)
Infraorder Nematalycina Lindquist, Krantz & Walter, 2009 (1 superfamily)
Superfamily Nematalycoidea Strenke, 1954 (2 families)
Family Micropsammidae Coineau & Theron, 1983 (1 genus, 1 species)
Family Nematalycidae Strenke, 1954 (4 genera, 4 species)
Family Proteonematalycidae Kethley, 1989 (1 genus, 1 species)
Infraorder Terpnacarida Oconnor, 1984 (2 superfamilies)
Superfamily Oehserchestoidea Kethley, 1977 (1 family)
Family Oehserchestidae Kethley, 1977 (1 genus, 4 species)
Family Grandjeanicidae Kethley, 1977 (1 genus, 3 species)
Superfamily Terpnacaroidea Grandjean, 1939 (1 family)
Family Terpnacaridae Grandjean, 1939 (2 genera, 11 species)
Infraorder Alicorhagiida Oconnor, 1984 (1 superfamily)
Superfamily Alicorhagioidea Grandjean, 1939 (1 family)
Family Alicorhagiidae Grandjean, 1939 (5 genera, 9 species)

References

Further reading

 
 
 
 
 

Acariformes